El Portal is a village in Miami-Dade County, Florida, United States. The name is derived from the Spanish term for "the gate", after two wooden gates that once stood as a gateway to the village. El Portal was originally annexed into the city of Miami in 1925. With the arrival of the Great Depression, Miami gave up its jurisdiction, and El Portal was incorporated as its own village in 1937. As of the 2020 census, the population of El Portal was 1,986, down from 2,325 in 2010.

History
El Portal is a small, diverse enclave between Miami Shores and Miami. It was incorporated on December 6, 1937. The enclave was originally the capital of the Tequesta tribal area, and was visited by Pedro Menéndez de Avilés in the 1560s. Three small subdivisions (now neighborhoods)—Sherwood Forest, El Jardin (Spanish for "The Garden"), and El Portal—merged into the Village of El Portal. Its borders include 91st Street on the north, the Little River Canal on the south, Northeast Fifth Avenue on the east and Northwest Fifth Avenue on the west.

The village's name is a Spanish term meaning "the gate," referring to two huge wooden gates on Northeast Second Avenue that were taken down in the 1940s.

The village was designated as a bird sanctuary by the state for more than 50 years, which means that the birds and trees cannot be harmed in any way. A nature trail winds its way through the village. El Portal also boasts links to prehistoric Indian life at the Little River Mound, a four-foot-high, innocuous grassy knoll that is actually an ancient burial ground. The Little River Mound, located in the Sherwood Forest neighborhood, is the first archaeological site to be publicly recognized and preserved in Miami-Dade County.

Geography
It is bordered to the south and east by the city of Miami, to the north by the village of Miami Shores, and to the southwest by unincorporated West Little River.

Surrounding areas
  Miami Shores
  Unincorporated Miami-Dade County    Miami Shores
 Unincorporated Miami-Dade County, Pinewood   Miami Shores, Miami
  West Little River    Miami
  West Little River, Miami

Demographics

2020 census

Note: the US Census treats Hispanic/Latino as an ethnic category. This table excludes Latinos from the racial categories and assigns them to a separate category. Hispanics/Latinos can be of any race.

As of 2010, there were 939 households, out of which 9.8% were vacant. In 2000, 33.8% had children under the age of 18 living with them, 39.2% were married couples living together, 21.7% had a female householder with no husband present, and 32.5% were non-families. 24.7% of all households were made up of individuals, and 6.2% had someone living alone who was 65 years of age or older. The average household size was 2.98 and the average family size was 3.59.

In 2000, the village population was spread out, with 25.4% under the age of 18, 9.3% from 18 to 24, 30.6% from 25 to 44, 24.4% from 45 to 64, and 10.4% who were 65 years of age or older. The median age was 36 years. For every 100 females, there were 97.1 males. For every 100 females age 18 and over, there were 96.7 males.

In 2000, the median income for a household in the village was $39,681, and the median income for a family was $41,029. Males had a median income of $27,222 versus $22,409 for females. The per capita income for the village was $14,782. About 16.3% of families and 22.2% of the population were below the poverty line, including 28.9% of those under age 18 and 9.3% of those age 65 or over.

As of 2000, speakers of English was spoken as a first language by 51.96% of residents, while speakers of French Creole made up 23.72% of the populace, Spanish at 22.38%, French 1.08%, and Jamaican patois was the mother tongue for 0.86% of the population.

Religion 
Catholicism is the most prevalent practice religion in El Portal (24%) according to city-stats.org, with 4% Judaism.

There has been a Rader Methodist church, considered the oldest church in Miami, since the 1920s. In early 2016, two developers have plans to convert the church into mixed-used space to offer tenants affordable rent.

Gallery

See also

 History of Florida
 Pedro Menéndez de Avilés

References

External links
 

Villages in Miami-Dade County, Florida
1937 establishments in Florida
Villages in Florida